Fatma Koşer Kaya (born 20 February 1968 in Çarşamba, Turkey) is a Dutch lawyer and politician of Turkish origin. As a member of Democrats 66 (D66) she was an MP from 8 September 2004 to 19 September 2012. She focused on social affairs. From February 2013 to June 2014, she was an alderwoman of Wassenaar. On 19 August 2015 she once again became a member of the House of Representatives, replacing Gerard Schouw. Her term in the House ended on 23 March 2017. In June 2018 she became alderwoman of Amersfoort.

Koşer Kaya grew up in Bergen op Zoom and studied international law at Tilburg University.

References 
  Parlement.com biography

1968 births
Living people
Aldermen in Utrecht (province)
People from Amersfoort
Aldermen of Wassenaar
Democrats 66 politicians
Dutch people of Turkish descent
20th-century Dutch lawyers
Dutch Muslims
Members of the House of Representatives (Netherlands)
People from Bergen op Zoom
People from Çarşamba
Tilburg University alumni
Turkish emigrants to the Netherlands
Dutch women lawyers
21st-century Dutch politicians
21st-century Dutch women politicians